Sound Experience was an American funk ensemble, founded at Morgan State College in Baltimore, Maryland, in 1970.

The group played locally and recorded with producer Stan Watson, recording with him in Philadelphia. They recorded several singles, two full-length albums and live album. A live album entitled Live At The Glen Mills Reform School For Boys was their debut full-length. It was released on GSF Records in 1973. Don't Fight the Feeling was released in 1974 on Philly Soulville Records and reached #57 on the Billboard R&B Albums chart. The title track was released as a single and reached #61 on the US Billboard R&B chart. Their subsequent album, Boogie Woogie, was released on Buddah Records in 1975 to less success. 

The ensemble recorded little thereafter, but have been sampled by hip hop groups. Collectables Records issued a CD retrospective of the group's output in 1994. The single J.P Walk was featured in the 1997 movie Boogie Nights.

Members

Arthur Grant
Linwood Fraling
Leroy Fraling
Melvin Miles
Reginald Wright
Johnny Foreman
Gregory Holmes
Albert Holmes
James Lindsey
Anton Scott
Everett Harris
Rodney Parks

References

Musical groups from Baltimore
American funk musical groups
Musical groups established in 1970
1970 establishments in Maryland